Maria Teresa da Silva Morais (born 21 July 1959) is a Portuguese politician who served as Minister of Culture, Equality and Citizenship in 2015. From 2011 to 2015, Morais served as the Secretary of State for Parliamentary Affairs and Equality. She is a member of the Social Democratic Party and was elected to the Assembly of the Republic by the Leiria constituency in 2015. He was Vice-President of the PSD, a member of the Permanent Political Commission led by Pedro Passos Coelho.

References

1959 births
Living people
Portuguese politicians
Culture ministers of Portugal
Women government ministers of Portugal
Social Democratic Party (Portugal) politicians